DZLB (1116 AM) is a college radio station owned and operated by the University of the Philippines Los Baños through its College of Development Communication. Its studio is located at the DZLB Broadcast Studio, 2nd Floor, College of Development Communication Building, UP Los Baños, Laguna.

It is being used as an experimental radio station of the Department of Development Broadcasting and Telecommunication. Its programming includes music programs and request shows, informative segments and talk shows and School-on-air programs.

History
Radyo DZLB was established in 1964 by the University of the Philippines Los Baños to provide educational programming to rural communities surrounding Los Baños. The station originally broadcast at 1200 kHz with a power of 250 watts. In 1978, the frequency was changed to 1116 kHz.

DZLB won a KBP Golden Dove Award for Best AM Station in 1994 and a Catholic Mass Media Award for Best Educational Radio Program in 2010.

In 2005, the station went inactive due to lack of equipment. Three years after, in October 2008, the station went back on-air with a more powerful transmitter & equipment. Since December 1 of the same year, DZLB broadcasts from 6:00AM to 12:00NN, Mondays to Sundays.

Before the first semester, Academic Year 2011-2012 ended, a groundbreaking ceremony was held at the antenna tower site of the station, located near the entrance of the University of the Philippines, as a new antenna tower will be built for DZLB. Since the second semester of the same academic year, the station went off-air.

DZLB will resume its regular broadcast on April 9, 2012. It is currently on its test broadcast in preparation for the station's return on the air.

See also
DZUP
DZLB-FM

References

College radio stations in the Philippines
Community radio stations in the Philippines
Radio stations established in 1964
University of the Philippines Los Baños
DZLB